"Love Lasts Forever" is a single by the Irish post-punk band Virgin Prunes, released in June 1986 on Baby Records in Europe, and on Touch and Go in the U.S.

Formats and track listing 
All songs written by the Virgin Prunes

UK 7" single (Baby 003)
"Love Lasts Forever" – 4:45
"True Life Story" – 3:25

UK 12" single (Baby 004)
US 12" single (T&G #15)
"Lovelornalimbo" – 7:47
"I Like the Way You’re Frightened" – 8:25

Personnel 

Virgin Prunes
 Mary D'Nellon – guitar
 Gavin Friday – vocals
 Pod – drums
 Strongman – bass guitar

Technical personnel
 Dave Ball – production

Charts

References

External links 
 

1986 songs
1986 singles
Virgin Prunes songs